Luta  is a village in the administrative district of Gmina Włodawa, within Włodawa County, Lublin Voivodeship, in eastern Poland, close to the border with Belarus.

History
A small town situated a few miles outside Sobibor. The town was occupied by Germans in the spring of 1940.
Luta was a forced labor camp for Jews that operated between 1940 and 1942 where hundreds of people were murdered.

References

Luta
Holocaust locations in Poland